The 1999–2000 Biathlon World Cup was a multi-race tournament over a season of biathlon, organised by the International Biathlon Union. The season started on 2 December 1999 in Hochfilzen, Austria, and ended on 19 March 2000 in Khanty-Mansiysk, Russia. It was the 23rd season of the Biathlon World Cup.

Calendar
Below is the IBU World Cup calendar for the 1999–2000 season.

World Cup podiums

Men

Women

Men's team

Women's team

Standings: Men

Overall 

Final standings after 25 races.

Individual 

Final standings after 4 races.

Sprint 

Final standings after 8 races.

Pursuit 

Final standings after 9 races.

Mass Start 

Final standings after 4 races.

Relay 

Final standings after 6 races.

Nation 

Final standings after 18 races.

Standings: Women

Overall 

Final standings after 25 races.

Individual 

Final standings after 4 races.

Sprint 

Final standings after 8 races.

Pursuit 

Final standings after 9 races.

Mass Start 

Final standings after 4 races.

Relay 

Final standings after 6 races.

Nation 

Final standings after 18 races.

Medal table

Achievements
Victory in this World Cup (all-time number of victories in parentheses)

Men
 , 6 (8) first places
 , 5 (14) first places
 , 3 (8) first places
 , 2 (17) first places
 , 2 (6) first places
 , 2 (5) first places
 , 1 (12) first place
 , 1 (9) first place
 , 1 (2) first place
 , 1 (2) first place
 , 1 (1) first place

Women
 , 6 (14) first places
 , 3 (19) first places
 , 3 (7) first places
 , 2 (6) first places
 , 2 (5) first places
 , 2 (3) first places
 , 2 (2) first places
 , 2 (2) first places
 , 1 (19) first place
 , 1 (3) first place
 , 1 (1) first place

Retirements
Following notable biathletes retired after the 1999–2000 season:

Footnotes

References

External links
IBU official site

Biathlon World Cup
1999 in biathlon
2000 in biathlon